João Marcos Coelho da Silva (1 June 1953 – 2 April 2020) was a Brazilian footballer who played as a goalkeeper.

Career
Born in Botucatu, João Marcos played club football for Guarani, São Bento, Noroeste, América de Rio Preto, Palmeiras and Grêmio.

He earned 1 cap for the Brazilian national team in 1984.

Later life and death
He died in a hospital in Botucatu on 2 April 2020, aged 66, from esophageal disease.

References

1953 births
2020 deaths
Brazilian footballers
Brazil international footballers
Guarani FC players
Esporte Clube São Bento players
Esporte Clube Noroeste players
América Futebol Clube (SP) players
Sociedade Esportiva Palmeiras players
Grêmio Foot-Ball Porto Alegrense players
Association football goalkeepers
People from Botucatu